Balanetta is a genus of small, often colorful, sea snails, marine gastropod molluscs in the taxonomic family of the margin shells (Marginellidae).

Species
 Balanetta amydrozona (Melvill, 1906)
 Balanetta baylii Jousseaume, 1875
 Balanetta cylichnella (May, 1917)
 Balanetta pisum (Reeve, 1865)
 Balanetta triptycta Le Renard & van Nieulande, 1985
Species brought into synonymy 
 Balanetta baylei Jousseaume, 1875: synonym of Balanetta baylii Jousseaume, 1875 (alternative original spelling; spelling baylii selected by First Reviser choice by Tomlin (1917))
 Balanetta decaryi Bavay, 1920: synonym of Ovaginella decaryi (Bavay, 1920)
 Balanetta ovulum (G.B. Sowerby, 1846): synonym of Ovaginella ovulum (G.B. Sowerby, 1846)

Description

Distribution

References

 Jousseaume, F., 1875. Coquilles de la famille des marginelles, Monographie. Revue et Magasin de Zoologie Pure et Appliquée 3(3): 164-278
 Cossignani T. (2006). Marginellidae & Cystiscidae of the World. L'Informatore Piceno. 408pp.

Marginellidae